The following is a list of notable events and releases that happened in 2019 in South Korean music.

Debuting and disbanding in 2019

Debuting groups

 1Team
 1the9
 3YE
 AB6IX
 Ariaz
 Argon
 BDC
 Bvndit
 Cherry Bullet
 CIX
 D1CE
 ENOi
 Everglow
 Exo-SC
 Fanatics
 Hinapia
 Itzy
 Jus2
 Newkidd
 Oneus
 Onewe
 OnlyOneOf
 Purplebeck
 Rocket Punch
 Rolling Quartz
 SuperM
 Teen Teen
 TXT
 Vanner
 Verivery
 We in the Zone
Wooseok x Kuanlin
 X1

Solo debuts

 Bae Jin-young
 Baekhyun
 Chen
 Ha Sung-woon
 Hwasa
 Hyuk
 Im Hyun-sik
 Jang Dae-hyeon
 Jang Dong-woo
 Jeon So-mi
 Jung Dae-hyun
 Kang Daniel
 Kang Min-kyung
 Kim Jin-woo
 Kim Ji-yeon
 Kim Jung-mo
 Kim Woo-sung
 Kwon Hyun-bin
 Lee Jin-hyuk
 Lee Jun-young
 Lee Min-hyuk
 Nichkhun
 Oh Ha-young
 Park Ji-hoon
 Roh Tae-hyun
 Ruann
 Sulli
 Sungmin
U-Know
 U-Kwon
 Yoon Ji-sung
 Yoona
 Yukika
 Zelo

Disbandments

 14U
15&
 A-Jax
 B.A.P
 Big Star
Boyfriend
CocoSori
Drug Restaurant
Good Day
Hello Venus
Hi Suhyun
Honeyst
Kim Heechul & Kim Jungmo
Myteen
 Nine Muses
 Pristin
 Pristin V
Seenroot
TraxX
 UNB
 Untouchable
 Wanna One
 Wassup

Releases in 2019

First quarter

January

February

March

Second quarter

April

May

June

Third quarter

July

August

September

Fourth quarter

October

November

December

Deaths
 Woo Hye-mi, aged 31. Singer
 Sulli, aged 25. Singer, actress and former member of f(x)
 Goo Hara, aged 28. Singer, actress and former member of Kara

See also
List of South Korean films of 2019
List of Gaon Album Chart number ones of 2019
List of Gaon Digital Chart number ones of 2019

Notes

References

 
South Korean music
K-pop